Mohammed Al-Amri (born 26 November 1991) is a Saudi Arabian footballer who plays as a left back for Al-Faisaly in the Saudi Professional League.

External links
 

Living people
1991 births
Saudi Arabian footballers
Association football fullbacks
Ittihad FC players
Al-Raed FC players
Al-Wehda Club (Mecca) players
Al-Faisaly FC players
Sportspeople from Jeddah
Saudi Professional League players
Saudi First Division League players